Jack Cunningham (26 February 1912 – 1975) was a Canadian rower. He competed in the men's eight event at the 1936 Summer Olympics.

References

1912 births
1975 deaths
Canadian male rowers
Olympic rowers of Canada
Rowers at the 1936 Summer Olympics
Rowers from Hamilton, Ontario
20th-century Canadian people